Ryan James McDonald (September 4, 1930 – February 13, 2020) was an American film and television actor. He was known for playing the role of "Roy" in the American sitcom television series The Odd Couple.

Life and career 
McDonald was born in Philadelphia, Pennsylvania. He began his career in 1954, as playing the role of "Prof. Paul Britton #4" in the soap opera The Secret Storm. Later in his career, he appeared in three Broadway plays, Toys in the Attic,
Any Wednesday, and Catch Me if You Can.

In 1970, McDonald was cast as Roy, one of Oscar Madison's poker cronies and his accountant in the television series The Odd Couple, only appearing in the first season. He also had a recurring role in the soap opera television series Days of Our Lives as "Scotty Banning
from 1971 to 1973. 

He continued his career, mainly appearing in films and in such television programs as Nanny and the Professor, The Rockford Files, Police Woman, Mannix, The Doris Day Show, Quincy, M.E., Columbo, Hart to Hart, Emergency!, The Greatest American Hero, THe Facts of Life, Barnaby Jones, The Six Million Dollar Man, Here's Lucy, The Streets of San Francisco, Remington Steele, Quantum Leap, Knots Landing, and Newhart. He later appeared in another recurring role in Days of Our Lives, as shady lawyer "Chauncey Powell" from 1991 to 1992.

Death 
McDonald died in February 2020 in Hollywood, California, at the age of 89.

Filmography

Film

Television

References

External links 

Rotten Tomatoes profile

1930 births
2020 deaths
Male actors from Philadelphia
American male television actors
American male film actors
American male soap opera actors
20th-century American male actors
21st-century American male actors